The Bilderberg Conference 2012 took place from May 30 - June 3, 2012 and was held in Westfields Marriott Hotel, Chantilly, Virginia, United States. Previous conferences had already held been there, in 2002 and 2008. Haifa in Israel had previously been proposed as a possible venue for 2012.

Agenda
 The State of Trans-Atlantic Relations
 Is Vigorous Economic Growth Attainable?
 The Future of Democracy in the Developed World
 The US Political Landscape 
 The European Political Landscape 
 A Conversation on US Foreign Policy 
 The Politics and Geo-Politics of Energy 
 Stability and Instability in the Middle East 
 Imbalances, Austerity and Growth 
 Sustainability of the Euro and its Consequences 
 What Does Putin 2.0 Mean? 
 What Can the West Do about Iran?
 How Do Sovereign States Collaborate in Cyber Space? 
 China's Economic and Political Outlook

Delegates (alphabetical)

 Henri de Castries, Chairman and CEO, AXA Group
 Josef Ackermann, Chairman of the Management Board and the Group Executive Committee, Deutsche Bank AG
 Marcus Agius, Chairman, Barclays plc
 Fouad Ajami, Senior Fellow, The Hoover Institution, Stanford University
 Keith B. Alexander, Commander, US Cyber Command; Director, National Security Agency
 Joaquín Almunia, Vice-President - Commissioner for Competition, European Commission
 Roger C. Altman, Chairman of Evercore Partners
 Luís Amado, Chairman, Banco Internacional do Funchal (BANIF)
 Johan H. Andresen, Owner and CEO, FERD
 Matti Apunen, Director of Finnish Business and Policy Forum EVA
 Ali Babacan, Deputy Prime Minister for Economic and Financial Affairs
 Francisco Pinto Balsemão, President and CEO, Impresa; Former Prime Minister
 Nicolas Baverez, Partner, Gibson, Dunn & Crutcher LLP
 Christophe Béchu, Senator, and Chairman, General Council of Maine-et-Loire
 Prince Philippe of Belgium,  
 Enis Berberoğlu, Editor-in-Chief, Hürriyet Newspaper
 Franco Bernabè, Chairman and CEO, Telecom Italia
 Nick Boles, Member of Parliament
 Jonas Bonnier, President and CEO, Bonnier AB
 Svein Richard Brandtzæg, President and CEO, Norsk Hydro ASA
 Oscar Bronner, Publisher, Der Standard Medienwelt
 Gunilla Carlsson, Minister for International Development Cooperation
 Mark J. Carney, Governor, Bank of Canada
 Juan Luis Cebrián, CEO, PRISA; Chairman, El País
 Willibald Cernko, CEO, UniCredit Bank Austria AG
 Pierre André Chalendar,  Chairman and CEO of Saint-Gobain
 Jeppe Christiansen, CEO, Maj Invest
 Anatoly B. Chubais, CEO, OJSC RUSNANO
 Edmund Clark, W. Group President and CEO of TD Bank Group
 Kenneth Clarke, Member of Parliament, Lord Chancellor and Secretary of Justice
 Timothy C. Collins, CEO and Senior Managing Director, Ripplewood Holdings, LLC
 Fulvio Conti, CEO and General Manager, Enel S.p.A.
 Mitchell E. Daniels jr., Governor of Indiana
 Christopher DeMuth, Distinguished Fellow, Hudson Institute
 Thomas E. Donilon, National Security Advisor, The White House
 Robert Dudley, Group Chief Executive, BP plc
 John Elkann, Chairman, Fiat S.p.A.
 Thomas Enders, CEO of Airbus
 Michael J. Evans, Vice Chairman, Global Head of Growth Markets, Goldman Sachs & Co.
 Werner Faymann, Federal Chancellor of Austria
 Ulrik Federspiel, Executive Vice President of Haldor Topsøe A/S
 Niall Laurence A. Ferguson, Tisch Professor of History, Harvard University
 Douglas J. Flint, Group Chairman, HSBC Holdings plc
 Ying Fu, Vice Minister of Foreign Affairs, PRC
 Paul Gallagher, Former Attorney General; Senior Counsel
 Richard A. Gephardt, President and CEO, Gephardt Group
 Anastasios Giannitsis, Former Minister of Interior and Professor of Development and International Economics, University of Athens
 Austan D. Goolsbee, Professor of Economics, University of Chicago Booth School of Business
 Donald E. Graham, Chairman and CEO, The Washington Post Company
 Lilli Gruber, Journalist - Anchorwoman, La 7 TV
 Karel De Gucht, Commissioner for Trade, European Commission
 Victor Halberstadt, Professor of Economics, Leiden University; Former Honorary Secretary  General of Bilderberg Meetings
 Britt Harris, CIO, Teacher Retirement System of Texas
 eid Hoffman, Co-founder and Executive Chairman, LinkedIn
 Huang Yiping, Professor of Economics, China Center for Economic Research, Peking University
 Jon M. Huntsman jr., Chairman, Huntsman Cancer Foundation
 Wolfgang Ischinger, Chairman, Munich Security Conference; Global Head Government Relations, Allianz SE
 Igor S. Ivanov, Associate member, Russian Academy of Science; President, Russian International Affairs Council
 Erik Izraelewicz, CEO, Le Monde
 Kenneth M. Jacobs, Chairman and CEO, Lazard
 James A. Johnson, Vice Chairman of Perseus LLC.
 Vernon E. Jordan jr., Senior Managing Director, Lazard
 Alexander Karp, CEO of Palantir Technologies
 Alexander Karsner, Executive Chairman, Manifest Energy, Inc
 Anousheh Karvar, Inspector, Inter-ministerial Audit and Evaluation Office for Social, Health, Employment and Labor Policies  
 Garry Kasparov, Chairman, United Civil Front (of Russia)
 John Kerr, Independent Member, House of Lords
 John Kerry, U.S Minister of Foreign Affairs
 Fuat E. Keyman,  Director, Istanbul Policy Center and Professor of International Relations, Sabanci University
 Henry Kissinger, Chairman of Kissinger Associates Inc.
 Klaus Kleinfeld, Chairman and CEO, Alcoa
 Mustafa Koç, Chairman, Koç Holding A.Ş.
 Roland Koch, CEO, Bilfinger Berger SE
 Bassma Kodmani, Member of the Executive Bureau and Head of Foreign Affairs, Syrian National Council
 Henry R. Kravis, Co-Chairman and Co-CEO, Kohlberg Kravis Roberts & Co.
 Marie-Josée Kravis, Senior Fellow, Hudson Institute
 Neelie Kroes, Vice President, European Commission; Commissioner for Digital Agenda
 Fred Krupp, President, Environmental Defense Fund
 Pascal Lamy, Director-General, World Trade Organization
 Enrico Letta, Deputy Leader, Democratic Party of Italy
 Ariel E. Levite, Nonresident Senior Associate, Carnegie Endowment for International Peace
 Cheng Li, Director of Research and Senior Fellow, John L. Thornton China Center, Brookings Institution
 John Lipsky, Distinguished Visiting Scholar, Johns Hopkins University
 Andrew N. Liveris, President, Chairman and CEO, The Dow Chemical Company
 Peter Löscher, President and CEO, Siemens AG
 William J. Lynn, Chairman and CEO, DRS Technologies, Inc.
 Peter Mandelson, Member, House of Lords; Chairman, Global Counsel
 Jessica T. Mathews, President, Carnegie Endowment for International Peace
 Jacob Mchangama, Director of Legal Affairs, Center for Political Studies (CEPOS)
 Frank McKenna, Deputy Chair of TD Bank Group
 Kenneth B. Mehlman, Partner, Kohlberg Kravis Roberts & Co.
 John Micklethwait, Editor-in-Chief, The Economist
 Thierry de Montbrial, President, French Institute for International Relations
 Jorge Moreira da Silva, First Vice-President, Partido Social Democrata (PSD)
 Craig J. Mundie, Chief Research and Strategy Officer, Microsoft Corporation
 Matthias Nass, Chief International Correspondent, Die Zeit
 Beatrix of the Netherlands, Queen of the Netherlands
 Juan María Nin Génova, Deputy Chairman and CEO, Caixabank
 Michael Noonan, Minister for Finance
 Peggy Noonan, Author, Columnist, The Wall Street Journal
 Jorma Ollila, Chairman, Royal Dutch Shell, plc
 Peter R. Orszag, Vice Chairman, Citigroup
 Dimitri Papalexopoulos, Managing Director, Titan Cement Co.
 Alexander Pechtold, Parliamentary Leader of Democrats 66 
 Richard N. Perle, Resident Fellow, American Enterprise Institute
 Paul Polman, CEO of Unilever PLC
 Robert S. Prichard, Chair man of Torys LLP
 Itamar Rabinovich, Global Distinguished Professor, New York University
 Gideon Rachman, Chief Foreign Affairs Commentator, The Financial Times
 Steven Rattner, Chairman, Willett Advisors LLC
 Alison M. Redford, Premier of Alberta
 Heather M. Reisman, CEO, Indigo Books & Music Inc.
 Wolfgang Reitzle, CEO & President, Linde AG
 Kenneth S. Rogoff, Professor of Economics, Harvard University
 Charlie Rose, Executive Editor and Anchor, Charlie Rose
 Dennis B. Ross, Counselor, Washington Institute for Near East Policy
 Jacek Rostowski, Minister of Finance
 Robert E. Rubin, Co-Chair, Council on Foreign Relations; Former Secretary of the Treasury
 Mark Rutte, Prime Minister of the Netherlands
 Soraya Sáenz de Santamaría Antón, Vice President and Minister for the Presidency
 Paul Scheffer, Professor of European Studies, Tilburg University
 Eric E. Schmidt, Executive Chairman, Google Inc.
 Rudolf Scholten, Member of the Board of Executive Directors, Oesterreichische Kontrollbank AG
 Jean-Dominique Senard, CEO, Michelin Group
 David Shambaugh, Director, China Policy Program, George Washington University
 Josette Sheeran, Vice Chairman, World Economic Forum
 Risto Siilasmaa, Chairman of the Board of Directors, Nokia Corporation
 Jerry I. Speyer,  Chairman and Co-CEO, Tishman Speyer
 Pietro Supino, Chairman and Publisher, Tamedia AG
 Peter D. Sutherland, Chairman of Goldman Sachs International
 Peter A. Thiel, President, Clarium Capital / Thiel Capital
 Serpil Timuray, CEO, Vodafone Turkey
 Jürgen Trittin, Parliamentary Leader, Alliance 90/The Greens
 Loukas Tsoukalis, President, Hellenic Foundation for European and Foreign Policy
 Jutta Urpilainen, Minister of Finance
 Daniel L. Vasella, Chairman, Novartis AG
 Pierre Vimont, Executive Secretary General, European External Action Service
 Peter Voser, CEO of Royal Dutch Shell plc.
 Jacob Wallenberg, Chairman of Investor AB
 Kevin Warsh, Distinguished Visiting Fellow, The Hoover Institution, Stanford University
 Martin H. Wolf, Chief Economics Commentator of The Financial Times

References

External links
 Official website participants 2012 edition
 The agenda

2012 conferences
2012 in Virginia
Conferences in the United States
2012
May 2012 events in the United States
June 2012 events in the United States